The Cincinnati Transit Company (or Cincinnati Transit, Inc., abbreviated CT) was the public transit operator in Cincinnati, Ohio, United States, from 1952 to 1973. It began operation on December 30, 1952, and replaced the Cincinnati Street Railway.  The CSR had ceased streetcar operations in 1951, so CT provided only bus transit in the city. Initially, this included trolley bus service inherited from CSR, but trolley bus service in Cincinnati ended on June 18, 1965. CTC sold 15 Marmon-Herrington TC-48 trolleybuses to the Toronto Transit Commission in 1953. In 1973, the company was renamed Southwest Ohio Regional Transit Authority (SORTA).

See also
 Streetcars in Cincinnati

References

Bus transportation in Ohio
Transportation in Cincinnati
Government agencies established in 1952
Government agencies disestablished in 1973
1952 establishments in Ohio
1973 disestablishments in Ohio